Alexandria is a city in central Hanson County, South Dakota, United States. The population was 649 at the 2020 census. It is the county seat of Hanson County.

History
In 1879, the community was founded with the name Clarksville.  Its post office was established in 1880, and the city later incorporated in 1885 as Alexandria. The city was named after Alexander Mitchell.

Geography
Alexandria has been assigned the ZIP code 57311, and the FIPS place code 00820.

Climate

Demographics

Alexandria is part of the Mitchell, South Dakota Micropolitan Statistical Area.

2010 census
As of the census of 2010, there were 615 people, 231 households, and 171 families residing in the city. The racial makeup of the city was 98.5% White, 0.5% Asian, 0.7% from other races, and 0.3% from two or more races. Hispanic or Latino of any race were 1.6% of the population.

There were 231 households, of which 35.1% had children under the age of 18 living with them, 66.7% were married couples living together, 4.8% had a female householder with no husband present, 2.6% had a male householder with no wife present, and 26.0% were non-families. 23.8% of all households were made up of individuals, and 9.9% had someone living alone who was 65 years of age or older. The average household size was 2.66 and the average family size was 3.11.

The median age in the city was 37.5 years. 28.3% of residents were under the age of 18; 6.3% were between the ages of 18 and 24; 26.5% were from 25 to 44; 26.3% were from 45 to 64; and 12.8% were 65 years of age or older. The gender makeup of the city was 49.8% male and 50.2% female.

2000 census
As of the census of 2000, there were 563 people, 234 households, and 146 families residing in the city. The population density was 1,041.9 people per square mile (402.5/km). There were 251 housing units at an average density of 464.5 per square mile (179.5/km). The racial makeup of the city was 99.29% White, 0.18% Native American, 0.18% Asian, and 0.36% from two or more races. Hispanic or Latino of any race were 0.18% of the population.

There were 234 households, out of which 32.5% had children under the age of 18 living with them, 58.5% were married couples living together, 3.4% had a female householder with no husband present, and 37.2% were non-families. 34.2% of all households were made up of individuals, and 20.1% had someone living alone who was 65 years of age or older. The average household size was 2.41 and the average family size was 3.15.

In the city, the population was spread out, with 27.5% under the age of 18, 7.5% from 18 to 24, 27.5% from 25 to 44, 20.4% from 45 to 64, and 17.1% who were 65 years of age or older. The median age was 38 years. For every 100 females, there were 102.5 males. For every 100 females age 18 and over, there were 94.3 males.

The median income for a household in the city was $31,875, and the median income for a family was $45,333. Males had a median income of $30,500 versus $19,500 for females. The per capita income for the city was $16,120. About 2.8% of families and 6.2% of the population were below the poverty line, including 3.8% of those under age 18 and 9.7% of those age 65 or over.

Notable people
 Martin Conlan, member of the South Dakota State Senate
 Henry Montgomery, member of the South Dakota House of Representatives

See also
 List of cities in South Dakota

References

External links

 

Cities in South Dakota
Cities in Hanson County, South Dakota
County seats in South Dakota
Mitchell, South Dakota micropolitan area
Populated places established in 1880
1880 establishments in Dakota Territory